William "Willis" E. Gray (born 1848) was a state legislator serving in the Arkansas House of Representatives representing Pulaski County in 1881.  
He was elected to serve Pulaski County along with B. D. Williams,  and he served as a Republican.

In 1883 he was named as an alternative delegate to the National Convention. 

In 1888 Gray was appointed as an election judge for Young Township.

In 1890 he was selected to represent Young Township at the State Convention.

See also
African-American officeholders during and following the Reconstruction era

References 

Members of the Arkansas House of Representatives
1848 births
People from Pulaski County, Arkansas
Date of death unknown